Mityana, is a town in the Central Region of Uganda. It is the main municipal, administrative, and commercial center of Mityana District, and the district headquarters are located there.

Location
Mityana is about halfway between Kampala and Mubende, along an all-weather tarmac highway that links Uganda's capital with the city  of Fort Portal in the Western Region. The geographical coordinates of Mityana are 0°23'58.0"N, 32°02'36.0"E (Latitude:0.399444,
Longitude:32.043333).

Overview
The topography consists of gentle slopes with open, U-shaped valleys. The plateau landscape is advantageous to real estate developers because they do not incur many expenses for clearance of building sites. In July 2013, the town was added to the list of urban centers serviced by the National Water and Sewerage Corporation. Since then, NWSC has expanded service to other areas of Mityana District.

Population
In 2002, the national census estimated the population of Mityana town to be 34,100. In 2010, the Uganda Bureau of Statistics (UBOS) estimated the population at 38,700. In 2011, UBOS estimated the mid-year population at 39,300.

In August 2014, the national population census put the population of Mityana, as presently (February 2021), 95,428 people. In 2020, UBOS estimated the mid-year population of he town at 105,200. The population agency calculated the annual population growth rate of Mityana to average 1.68 percent, between 2014 and 2020.

Points of interest
The following points of interest are located near or within the town limits:

1. The offices of Mityana Town Council

2. Mityana Central Market

3. The headquarters of the Roman Catholic Diocese of Kiyinda–Mityana

4. Mityana General Hospital, a 120-bed public hospital administered by the Uganda Ministry of Health

5. The headquarters of Kolping Mityana Women's Project, a Tier IV financial institution

6.

7. Kampala−Mubende highway, passing through the center of town in a northwest/southeast direction

8. Mityana Secondary School, a public residential secondary school with 26 dormitories

9. William Mukasa Primary School, a mixed day and boarding primary school close to the district headquarters

10. LivingHope-Children Junior Academy, serving poor children in Buwalula, Kamuli, and Jezza

11. Mityana Modern Secondary School, a private secondary school, founded in 1994.

Road improvement and development 
In Aril 2021, the Uganda National Roads Authority (UNRA) hired Energo Project Uganda Limited, a construction company, to improve the  Mityana–Mubende Road, at a cost of UGX:396 billion (approx. US$105 million). That contract includes the tarmacking of several urban roads in Mityana Town, some for the first time ever. Construction is expected to conclude in April 2024.

See also
 Hospitals in Uganda
 List of cities and towns in Uganda

References

External links
 Brief Town Profile As of 2013.

Populated places in Central Region, Uganda
Cities in the Great Rift Valley
Mityana District